The R229 road is a short regional road in Ireland, located in Letterkenny, County Donegal.

References

Regional roads in the Republic of Ireland
Roads in County Donegal